The suburb of Newtown lies in the southern part of Wellington in New Zealand. It  lies east of Vogeltown, between Mount Cook and Berhampore. The main thoroughfares of Newtown are Riddiford St, leading from Mount Cook to Berhampore and Melrose, and Constable St, leading from Newtown to Kilbirnie.

History
Originally a working-class suburb, Newtown has followed gentrification trends in recent years, attracting large numbers of immigrants, students and young professionals and resulting in an ethnically diverse population. The Wellington City Council District Plan identifies Newtown as a suburb with an "identifiable or distinct character".

Demographics 

Newtown had a population of 9,180 at the 2018 New Zealand census, an increase of 780 people (9.3%) since the 2013 census, and an increase of 1,299 people (16.5%) since the 2006 census. There were 3,351 households. There were 4,314 males and 4,866 females, giving a sex ratio of 0.89 males per female, with 1,056 people (11.5%) aged under 15 years, 3,420 (37.3%) aged 15 to 29, 3,825 (41.7%) aged 30 to 64, and 882 (9.6%) aged 65 or older.

Ethnicities were 65.5% European/Pākehā, 10.1% Māori, 8.2% Pacific peoples, 18.8% Asian, and 8.7% other ethnicities (totals add to more than 100% since people could identify with multiple ethnicities).

The proportion of people born overseas was 35.4%, compared with 27.1% nationally.

Although some people objected to giving their religion, 52.2% had no religion, 29.1% were Christian, 3.7% were Hindu, 4.7% were Muslim, 1.4% were Buddhist and 4.6% had other religions.

Of those at least 15 years old, 3,504 (43.1%) people had a bachelor or higher degree, and 780 (9.6%) people had no formal qualifications. The employment status of those at least 15 was that 4,530 (55.8%) people were employed full-time, 1,194 (14.7%) were part-time, and 477 (5.9%) were unemployed.

Features

Government House on Rugby Street, Wellington Hospital located on Riddiford Street and Wellington Zoo all lie within the boundaries of Newtown. Newtown Park is located next to the Zoo, off Roy Street and provides a venue for athletics and football. The Park consists of a 400m all-weather running track, grandstand, changing rooms, community rooms and play area. Wellington City Council has spent $3.6 million on modernising facilities at Newtown Park to meet current and future needs for the athletics and soccer sports codes, and the wider community.

Newtown Festival

The annual Newtown Festival takes place over one day, culminating in the Newtown Festival Street Fair which is usually held on International Children's Day (usually the first Sunday in March). Organised by The Newtown Residents' Association for the past 18 years, the festival has continued to grow. The 2014 Newtown Festival was attended by an estimated 80,000 people. In 2014 the  Wellington Gold Awards nominated the organisers of the Newtown Festival for one of their annual awards, citing that the festival is "New Zealand’s largest free annual outdoor street festival."

Education

Newtown School

The school has a Māori language immersion class, Ngāti Kotahitanga, providing an 80 per cent immersion environment. It also has an indoor heated swimming pool, computer suite, and separate junior and senior playgrounds.

Other schools

References

External links 

History of Newtown & Berhampore

Suburbs of Wellington City